Rushmere Division, Suffolk is an electoral division of Suffolk which returns one county councillor to Suffolk County Council. It is located in the North East Area of Ipswich and comprises the whole of Rushmere Ward plus part of St John's Ward, both of which are electoral wards of Ipswich Borough Council.

References

Electoral Divisions of Suffolk